Taylor Campbell Rochestie (born July 1, 1985) is an American-born naturalized Montenegrin professional basketball player for Le Mans of the French Pro A. He also represents the senior Montenegrin national basketball team internationally.

Early life
Rochestie was born to Howard Rochestie, a Trenton, NJ native of Jewish descent, and Christina (née Campbell) in Houston, Texas.

High school career
Rochestie attended Santa Barbara High School in California, where he started playing basketball, and graduated as the all-time leading scorer of his high school's history.

College career
In 2004, Rochestie attended Tulane University, where he played one year of college basketball, with the Tulane Green Wave. He then transferred to Washington State University, where he sat out the 2006 academic year, due to NCAA rules. He then played with the Washington State Cougars from 2007 to 2009.

Professional career
Rochestie went undrafted in the 2009 NBA draft. On July 30, 2009, he signed his first professional contract with BG Göttingen of Germany for the 2009–10 season. He helped his team to win the 2010 EuroChallenge title, and was also named the Final Four MVP.

On June 23, 2010, he signed a one-year deal with Galatasaray Café Crown of the Turkish Basketball Super League. On February 8, 2011, he parted ways with Galatasaray. Nine days later, he returned to Germany, and signed with Alba Berlin for the rest of the season.

On August 2, 2011, he signed a one-year deal with Le Mans Sarthe Basket of the French LNB Pro A. 

On July 20, 2012, Rochestie signed a two-year deal with Caja Laboral of the Spanish Liga ACB. On January 8, 2013, he parted ways with Laboral. The next day, he signed with Angelico Biella of the Italian Serie A for the rest of the season.

On August 26, 2013, he signed a one-year contract with the Italian club Montepaschi Siena. On January 5, 2014, he left Siena and signed with Nizhny Novgorod of Russia for the rest of the season. On July 30, 2014, he re-signed with Nizhny for one more season. On May 5, 2015, he was awarded with the Alphonso Ford EuroLeague Top Scorer Trophy, an annual award given to the EuroLeague's top scorer of the season. Nizhny Novgorod's season in their national domestic league (VTB United League) ended, after they were eliminated by CSKA Moscow, with 3–0 sweep in the league's semifinal playoff series.

On June 21, 2015, Rochestie signed a two-year deal, with an option for another one, with the Israeli club Maccabi Tel Aviv. On September 3, 2016, he parted ways with Maccabi. Two days later, he signed a one-year contract with Russian club Lokomotiv Kuban.

On September 8, 2017, Rochestie signed with Serbian club Crvena zvezda for the 2017–18 season. 

On August 19, 2018, Rochestie inked with Tianjin Gold Lions of the Chinese Basketball Association. On March 26, 2019, he signed with NBL team Anhui Dragons to continue his career in China. 

On October 26, 2019, Rochestie officially signed with Greek club Olympiacos, making his return to the EuroLeague. He averaged 4.6 points, 1.0 rebound and 3.6 assists per game. 

On October 7, 2020, Rochestie returned to Crvena zvezda and signed a 2-month contract with an option to extend it until the end of the 2020–21 season. The extension was not exercised, leading Rochestie to leave the club in December 2020.

On December 18, 2020, Rochestie signed with Hapoel Haifa of the  Israel Basketball Premier League.

On October 4, 2021, Rochestie signed with Le Mans of the French LNB Pro A.

On December 14, 2021, Rochestie returned to Tianjin Pioneers.

On February 23, 2023, he signed with Le Mans of the French Pro A.

National team career
Rochestie is a member of the senior Montenegrin national basketball team. With Montenegro's national team, he played at the qualifying tournament for EuroBasket 2013, and the qualifying tournament for EuroBasket 2015.

Career statistics

EuroLeague

|-
| style="text-align:left;"| 2012–13
| style="text-align:left;"| Baskonia
| 4 || 0 || 7.6 || .182 || .250 || .333 || .3 || .3 || 1.0 || .0 || 1.5 || -.8
|-
| style="text-align:left;"| 2013–14
| style="text-align:left;"| Montepaschi
| 10 || 0 || 16.7 || .403 || .391 || .857 || 1.5 || 1.7 || .5 || .0 || 6.5 || 3.4
|-
| style="text-align:left;"| 2014–15
| style="text-align:left;"| Nizhny Novgorod 
| 21 || 17 || 30.0 || .511 || .500 || style="background:#CFECEC;"|.925 || 1.6 || 5.7 || .6 || .0 || style="background:#CFECEC;"|18.9 || 21.0
|-
| style="text-align:left;"| 2015–16
| style="text-align:left;"| Maccabi Tel Aviv
| 10 || 5 || 29.3 || .429 || .404 || .920 || 2.1 || 5.5 || .2 || .0 || 14.0 || 13.5
|-
| style="text-align:left;"| 2017–18
| style="text-align:left;"| Crvena zvezda
| 30 || 29 || 26.0 || .493 || .407 || .891 || 2.3 || 5.0 || .8 || .1 || 13.4 || 14.4
|- class="sortbottom"
| style="text-align:center;" colspan=2| Career
| 75 || 51 || 25.4 || .476 || .436 || .900 || 1.8 || 4.6 || .6 || .0 || 13.5 || 13.9

Domestic leagues

References

External links
 Taylor Rochestie at acb.com 
 Taylor Rochestie at euroleague.net
 Taylor Rochestie at fiba.com
 Taylor Rochestie at legabasket.it 
 Taylor Rochestie at tblstat.net
 Taylor Rochestie at RealGM.com
 

1985 births
Living people
Montenegrin men's basketball players
American men's basketball players
American emigrants to Montenegro
ABA League players
Alba Berlin players
American expatriate basketball people in China
American expatriate basketball people in France
American expatriate basketball people in Germany
American expatriate basketball people in Israel
American expatriate basketball people in Italy
American expatriate basketball people in Russia
American expatriate basketball people in Serbia
American expatriate basketball people in Spain
American expatriate basketball people in Turkey
American people of Jewish descent
Anhui Dragons players
Basketball League of Serbia players
BC Nizhny Novgorod players
BG Göttingen players
Galatasaray S.K. (men's basketball) players
Hapoel Haifa B.C. players
Jewish men's basketball players
KK Crvena zvezda players
Le Mans Sarthe Basket players
Liga ACB players
Maccabi Tel Aviv B.C. players
Mens Sana Basket players
Montenegrin expatriate basketball people in Turkey
Montenegrin expatriate basketball people in Serbia
Montenegrin expatriate basketball people in Russia
Montenegrin expatriate basketball people in Spain
Montenegrin people of American-Jewish descent
Naturalized citizens of Montenegro
Olympiacos B.C. players
Pallacanestro Biella players
PBC Lokomotiv-Kuban players
Point guards
Saski Baskonia players
Shooting guards
Tianjin Pioneers players
Tulane Green Wave men's basketball players
Washington State Cougars men's basketball players